
Gmina Markusy is a rural gmina (administrative district) in Elbląg County, Warmian-Masurian Voivodeship, in northern Poland.

Villages
Gmina Markusy contains the villages and settlements of Balewo, Brudzędy, Dzierzgonka, Jezioro, Jurandowo, Kępniewo, Krzewsk, Markusy, Nowe Dolno, Nowe Kępniewo, Rachowo, Stalewo, Stankowo, Stare Dolno, Topolno Małe, Tynowo, Węgle-Żukowo, Wiśniewo, Zdroje, Złotnica, Żółwiniec, Żurawiec, Zwierzeńskie Pole and Zwierzno.

Neighbouring gminas
Gmina Markusy is bordered by the gminas of Dzierzgoń, Elbląg, Gronowo Elbląskie, Rychliki and Stare Pole.

References
Polish official population figures 2006

Markusy
Elbląg County